The Force India VJM02 was Force India's Formula One car for the 2009 Formula One season. It was revealed in a low-key press event, after the car's first test at the Silverstone Circuit, on February 28, 2009, before a public test at the Circuito de Jerez in Spain the following day. The Northamptonshire-based team's car is decorated in the colours of the Indian flag, and was driven by the same drivers as in 2008  – Giancarlo Fisichella and Adrian Sutil.

The VJM02 was the first British-based foreign F1 car to utilize ExxonMobil fuel and lubricants as Mobil brand, in which Esso and Exxon was used on Red Bull RB13 8 years later along with Mobil from 2017, as they are currently ExxonMobil brands from 1999. The VJM02 was also the first Mercedes-powered non-McLaren Formula One car since the Sauber C13 in the 1994 season.

Development
Two men instrumental in the early design of the VJM02, chief technical officer Mike Gascoyne and team principal Colin Kolles, were released from their contracts in late 2008, after a conflict with team owner Vijay Mallya. The team decided late in development to change from a Ferrari to a Mercedes engine, along with McLaren gearboxes and hydraulics. Adapting to these new components required a minor redesign of several parts of the car, including the suspension, side-pods and the rear aerodynamics. In making such a late switch, the team chose to forfeit testing time in favour of development time, but were confident that the change gave them a better car than would otherwise have been the case. The car also had a livery change, which turned from a white, red and gold paintjob, to a white, green and orange livery, which are the colours of the Flag of India, to note their Hindi heritage.

At the 2009 Bahrain Grand Prix, a revised floor and diffuser for the VJM02 were introduced, as well as an upgraded front wing and reprofiled sidepods. Driver Giancarlo Fisichella welcomed the upgrades, claiming the car's current lack of downforce will be addressed by the new modifications. The team brought further updates at the 2009 European Grand Prix, which worked very well, giving the team their first podium finish at Spa, a day after Fisichella scored an unexpected pole position.

Technical specifications
New rules in place for the 2009 season require cars to have narrower and higher rear wings and wider and lower front wings, designed to reduce air disturbance to following cars and hence make overtaking easier. Slick tyres will be re-introduced into Formula One, after being absent since 1998. This will increase the VJM02's tyre grip by about 20%.

The VJM02 had the option to feature a Kinetic Energy Recovery System (KERS), which allows energy which would otherwise be wasted while braking to be re-used in set amounts per lap, via a boost button on the driver's steering wheel. The energy is stored in either a battery or a flywheel. This is the result of new rules for the 2009 season. The VJM02 was supposed to use the same system from the McLaren MP4-24, however Force India did not use it during the season.

Season summary 
Overall, the VJM02’s performance was almost as equally as poor as last season’s, only getting two points finishes, which ended up with them 9th on the constructors championship . 

Despite this, those two points finishes were remarkable: in Belgium, Fisichella got a surprise first pole position for the team and eventually finished second behind Kimi Räikkönen, which eventually gave him a fill-in spot in Ferrari in place of the injured Felipe Massa (Vitantonio Liuzzi being his replacement), while Sutil managed a fourth place and a fastest lap in the next race, the Italian Grand Prix.

Complete Formula One results
(key) (results in bold indicate pole position; results in italics indicate fastest lap)

 Driver failed to finish, but was classified as they had completed >90% of the race distance.

References

External links

Force India Formula One cars
2009 Formula One season cars